The Brünig Pass, at an altitude of , connects the Bernese Oberland and central Switzerland, linking Meiringen in the canton of Bern and Lungern in the canton of Obwalden. It is on the watershed between the upper reaches of the Aare, which flows through Lake Brienz and Lake Thun, and the Sarner Aa, which flows into Lake Lucerne.

The pass is crossed by the Zentralbahn's Brünig railway line, between Lucerne and Interlaken, and that line's Brünig-Hasliberg station is situated in the pass. The pass is also crossed by the A8 motorway, between Lucerne and Spiez. Both rail and road crossings are normally kept open throughout the winter.

The pass is the starting or finishing point of many hikes. Particularly popular is the route to or from the Brienzer Rothorn, which is accessible by rail at both ends. 

The pass was on a general transport route with the southern Grimsel and Gries passes connecting central Switzerland with present-day Italian Domodossola. It is assumed the route was in use since roman times, when the Romans controlled Vindonissa.  

In 1339 the warriors of central Switzerland marched towards the Battle of Laupen over the Brünig pass. In 1383, warriors of Lucerne, Schwyz and Uri among others crossed over the Brünig pass to support the Bernse troops in the siege of Burgdorf. 

In 1856 the Federal funds led to the construction of a street over the pass. In 1861 the road was completed and inaugurated. In the 19th century and before the inauguration of the Brünig railway, up to 120 private carriages and post wagons shall have crossed the pass. 

The pass is the subject of a watercolour painting by J. M. W. Turner, entitled The Brunig Pass, from Meiringen, and dating from c.1847-8.

See also
List of highest paved roads in Europe
List of mountain passes
List of the highest Swiss passes

References

External links

Weather report for the Brünig Pass

Mountain passes of Switzerland
Mountain passes of Obwalden
Bernese Oberland
Mountain passes of the canton of Bern
Bern–Obwalden border
Rail mountain passes of Switzerland